The Albert B. Corey Prize is an academic prize, granted jointly by the Canadian Historical Association and American Historical Association every two years for the best historical books on the history of Canada and the United States of America, or on Canadian-American relations. The prize has been awarded biennially since 1967, and notable recipients include Gustave Lanctot, Charles Perry Stacey, James Eayrs, and James L. Axtell.

Establishment 
The Albert B. Corey Prize was established in 1967, jointly by the American Historical Association and Canadian Historical Association. The prize is named after its proposer, Albert B. Corey, who then chaired a joint committee of members from both associations, and suggested the establishment of such a prize to encourage research in Canadian-American relations.

Recipients

References 

History awards
Canadian non-fiction literary awards
American history awards